Alexander (fl. 50–65) was a Christian heretical teacher in Ephesus. Hymenaeus and Alexander were proponents of antinomianism, the belief that Christian morality was not required. They put away—"thrust from them"—faith and a good conscience; they wilfully abandoned the great central facts regarding Christ, and so they "made shipwreck concerning the faith."

Hymenaeus is associated with the false teacher Philetus. What they taught is described by Paul as "profane babblings," and as leading to more ungodliness. Their heresy consisted of saying that the resurrection was past already, and the heresy had been so far successful in that it had overthrown the faith of some. The doctrine of these three heretical teachers, Hymenaeus, Alexander and Philetus, was one of the early forms of Gnosticism. It held that matter was originally and essentially evil; that for this reason the body was not an essential part of human nature; and that the only resurrection was that of each man as he awoke from the death of sin's penalty. That thus in the case of everyone who was set free from the consequences of wrongdoing, "the resurrection was past already," and that the body did not participate in the blessedness of the future life, but that salvation consisted in the soul's complete deliverance from all contact with a material world and a material body.

So pernicious were these teachings of incipient Gnosticism in the Christian church that, according to Paul, they quickly spread "like gangrene." The denial of the future resurrection of the body involved also the denial of the bodily resurrection of Christ, and even the fact of the incarnation. The way in which Paul dealt with those who taught such deadly error was by resorting to the same extreme measures as he had employed in the case of the immoral person at Corinth: he delivered Hymenaeus and Alexander to Satan, that they might learn not to blaspheme.

Some scholars identify him with the Alexander of Acts 19:33, or Alexander the Coppersmith, or both.

Pilgrim's Progress

He is also referenced in Pilgrim's Progress as a hypocrite on his way to hell.

References

People in the Pauline epistles
First Epistle to Timothy